Freda' (Swedish for Friday) is a pop group from Gnosjö in Sweden, formed in 1983, dissolved in 1993 and revived in 2009. (Uno Svenningsson, the group's singer and songwriter, pursued a solo career during its hiatus.) The group chose its name to commemorate the Friday on which it won a rock band competition. Its breakthrough hit was the song "Vindarna", released in 1986; it won Grammis Awards in 1988 and 1990.

Discography

Albums
Studio albums

Compilations

Singles
Charting at Sverigetopplistan

Others singles (Svensktoppen and Sverige Tracks)
1988: "I en annan del av världen"
1991: "Det saknas lite värme"
1993: "Så länge jag lever"

Other singles (non-charting)
1984: "Livsviktigt"
1984: "En människa"
1986: "Doktorn"
1986: "Ingen kan förklara"
1988: "Jag kan se dig"
1991: "Erika"
1993: "Alla behöver"
2009: "Bäste vän"
2010: "Gå aldrig ensam"
2010: "Det måste gå - 2010"

References

External links

Musical groups established in 1983
Swedish pop music groups
1983 establishments in Sweden